Carex rugulosa, also known as the thick-nerve sedge or the slender-culm thick-nerve sedge, is a tussock-forming perennial in the family Cyperaceae. It is native to eastern parts of Asia.

Description
The rhizomous sedge has a prostrate stem, known as a stolon that runs along or slightly below the surface of the ground. It is able to produce new plants from buds found at the tip or nodes. The stems, or culms, of the sedge are typically  in length with a triangular cross-section. The culms are smooth toward the bottom and become rougher toward the top. The base is often surrounded by red-brown coloured sheaths that deteriorate into a fibrous mass over time. There are clusters of leafy bracts beneath in inflorescences.

Taxonomy
The species was first described by the botanist Georg Kükenthal in 1903. It has one synonym, Carex smirnovii

Distribution
The range of the plant extends from Tuva in Russia in the north west down to the northern part of Central China in the south west, through the Korean Peninsula to Japan in the east. It can grow in along the lower reaches of rivers and in brackish marshes forming dense stands.

See also
 List of Carex species

References

rugulosa
Plants described in 1903
Taxa named by Georg Kükenthal
Flora of Mongolia
Flora of China
Flora of Japan
Flora of Korea
Flora of Siberia